The Isen is a small river in southeast Upper Bavaria with a length of about 81 kilometres. The Isen rises near Lacken (in the municipality of Maitenbeth, district of Mühldorf am Inn) and flows through one of the most unspoiled regions of Old Bavaria (Altbayern): the Isen Valley.

First seeing the light of day in the district of Mühldorf, the waters of the Isen flow initially into the district of Erding the villages of Isen, Lengdorf and Dorfen, and then return again to Mühldorf district coursing through (Schwindegg, Ampfing, Mettenheim, Mühldorf am Inn and Erharting). Finally it flows into the Inn in the district of Altötting, municipality Winhöring, opposite Neuötting.

The mouth of the Isen where it discharges into the Inn was moved further west to between the villages of Kronberg and Unterau in the municipality of Winhöring in the 19th century during the building of the München–Mühldorf–Simbach railway line. Its original mouth was near the village of Kager. Even today a few marshy spots in the fields and meadows give away the old course of the Isen.

The Isen Valley, with its tributaries, is a Special Area of Conservation (Fauna-Flora-Habitat-Richtlinie or FFH) that is threatened by the construction of the A 94 motorway.

The water quality of the Isen is moderately to critically polluted.
Its tributaries are the Lappach, Ornaubach, Kagnbach and Goldach.

Sources 
 Rudolf Angermeier, Adolf Kunzmann: Isengau. Pannonia-Verlag, Freilassing 1978.

References

TV Documentaries 
 Die Isen. TV series Topographie by Dieter Wieland. Bayerischer Rundfunk 1981.
 Mein Isental. Nature documentary by Jan Haft. Bayerisches Fernsehen 2007. 45 min.

Rivers of Bavaria
Rivers of Germany